Original Mirrors were a British new wave band formed in Liverpool in 1979. Featuring members of several earlier punk/new wave bands, they signed to Mercury Records and released two albums before splitting up in 1981, with members going on to play in the Lightning Seeds and Status Quo.

History
The band was formed in 1979 by songwriters Ian Broudie (formerly of Big in Japan and Secrets) and Steve Allen (formerly of Deaf School). They recruited former XTC/Stadium Dogs keyboardist/guitarist Jonathan Perkins, Phil Spalding, formerly bassist with Bernie Tormé, and drummer Pete Kircher.

They were signed by Mercury Records and their first release was the single "Could This Be Heaven" in November 1979. A second single, "Boys Cry", preceded a self-titled debut album in February 1980. Jimmy Hughes replaced Spalding prior to the band's second album, Heart, Twango & Raw Beat (1981). A final single, "20,000 Dreamers", followed before the band split up.

Spalding left to join Toyah then later GTR and Mike Oldfield's band. Broudie went on to form Care and later the Lightning Seeds, also establishing himself as a successful producer. Kircher joined Status Quo in 1982, staying in the band until 1985. Allen went on to be Senior A&R Director at WEA's Eternal label. Hughes joined Department S.

Discography

Albums
Original Mirrors (1980)
Heart-Twango & Raw-Beat (1981)

Compilations
Heartbeat - the Best of the Original Mirrors (1996)

Singles
"Could This Be Heaven" (1979)
"Boys Cry" (1980)
"Flying" (1980) - Italy-only release
"Dancing with the Rebels" (1981)
"20,000 Dreamers" (1981)

References

External Links
 
 

English new wave musical groups
Musical groups established in 1979
Musical groups from Liverpool
Musical groups disestablished in 1981
Mercury Records artists